Melissa Pais is an Indian actress working in Hindi TV industry. She also worked in Sajan Re Jhoot Mat Bolo as Preeti and Golmaal Hai Bhai Sab Golmaal Hai as Dhawal's lover. She also appeared in Pritam Pyare Aur Woh as Bhutrina.She is currently appears in Neeli Chatri Waale as Baby Dubey. She portrays the role of Hirani in Chidiya Ghar.

Filmography

References

External links

Living people
Actresses from Goa
Indian television actresses
Actresses from Mumbai
21st-century Indian actresses
Year of birth missing (living people)